Joseph Ralph Brown (April 27, 1926 – December 13, 2016) was an American football player and coach.  He served as the head football coach at Washburn University in Topeka, Kansas from 1959 to 1961, compiling a record of 9–18.

Playing career
Brown played as a fullback in 1946 at Oklahoma Agricultural and Mechanical College—now  known as Oklahoma State University–Stillwater.  The next year, he transferred to the University of Kansas to play center.  He did not play his last two years of college because of a back injury.

Coaching career
Brown began his coaching career in the high school rank in Kansas he was the head football coach at Sublette High School from 1950 to 1952, Junction City High SChool in 1953, and Emporia High School from 1954 to 1957.  In 1958, he was hired as head track coach and assistant football coach at Washburn University in Topeka, Kansas.  After service a year as line coach under Dick Godlove, Brown was named the 26th head football coach at Washburn University, serving for three seasons, from 1959 to 1961, and compiling a record of compiling a record of 9–18.

Head coaching record

College

References

External links
 

1926 births
2016 deaths
American football centers
American football fullbacks
Kansas Jayhawks football players
Oklahoma State Cowboys football players
Washburn Ichabods football coaches
High school football coaches in Kansas
People from Newton, Kansas